Speed Cop is a 1926 American silent action film directed by Duke Worne and starring Billy Sullivan, Rose Blossom and Francis Ford.

Cast
 Billy Sullivan
 Rose Blossom.
 Francis Ford

References

Bibliography
 Munden, Kenneth White. The American Film Institute Catalog of Motion Pictures Produced in the United States, Part 1. University of California Press, 1997.

External links

1926 films
1920s action films
American action films
Films directed by Duke Worne
American silent feature films
1920s English-language films
Rayart Pictures films
American black-and-white films
1920s American films
Silent action films